A Chief Scout is the principal or head scout for an organization such as the military, colonial administration or expedition or a talent scout in performing, entertainment or creative arts, particularly sport. In sport, a Chief Scout can be the principal talent scout seeking new players or a tactical scout.

A Chief Scout or Chief of Scouts was a person in charge of intelligence, reconnaissance, and scouting in the English Navy, armies or in expeditions, colonies or frontiers such as in the Americas and southern Africa. The title dates from at least the English Civil War..

 See: Frederick Russell Burnham, Chief Scout of the British South Africa Company and Chief of Scouts to field marshal Lord Roberts during the Boer War.

Some organisations in the Scout Movement adopted the title Chief Scout for the uniformed head of the organization. In some countries where Scouting is particularly well-established, the Chief Scout may be the head of state.

Chief Scout (The Scout Association)
Chief Scout (Scouting Ireland)
Chief Scout Executive for the administrative head of the Boy Scouts of America
List of Chief Scouts of the Polish Scouting Association
Robert Baden-Powell, first Chief Scout of The Boy Scouts Association who was proclaimed "Chief Scout of the World".

See also 
 Chief Scout's Award

References

Talent agents
Positions of authority